Malaysia national amateur boxing athletes represents Malaysia in regional, continental and world tournaments and matches governed by the International Boxing Association (AIBA).

Southeast Asian Games

2005 Manila Southeast Asian Games

Six amateur male boxers competed for  9 gold medals of the men's divisions in this edition of the Southeast Asian Games. Malaysia was not represented by any female boxers.

Entry list
 Mohd Nazzi Bin Mat Yusof (Pinweight)
 Zamzai Azizi Bin Mohamad (Light Flyweight) - Bronze
 Eddey Kalai (Featherweight) - Bronze 
 Zulkarnain Bin Mustafa (Light Welterweight)
 Paunandes Paulus (Lightweight) - Bronze 
 Mohd Khairul Akhmal B Kamal (Middleweight)

Asian Games

2005 Doha Asian Games

Three amateur boxers represented Malaysia in this edition of the Asiad. None of the three boxers qualified for the quarterfinal bouts.

Entry list
 Eddey Kalai (Featherweight) 
 Zamzai Azizi Mohamad (Light Flyweight)
 Paunandes Paulus (Lightweight)

References

Boxing in Malaysia
Amateur boxing